Checa can mean:

Places
Checa, Ecuador
Checa, Spain

People
Carlos Checa, Spanish motorcycle racer
David Checa, Carlos's younger brother, also a Spanish motorcycle racer
Maria Checa, a Colombian-American model and actress
Ulpiano Checa (1860–1916), Spanish artist

Other
Checa (Spanish Civil War), a slang term for the unofficial jails and torture chambers operated by leftists during the Spanish Civil War. The name comes from the Soviet secret police Cheka

See also

Chica (disambiguation)